Johan Lassagård (born 22 June 1994) is a Swedish footballer who plays for IFK Värnamo.

References

1994 births
Living people
Swedish footballers
Association football midfielders
Vinbergs IF players
Falkenbergs FF players
IFK Värnamo players
Allsvenskan players
Superettan players
Ettan Fotboll players